Evanka Osmak (born September 20, 1980) is a sports anchor for Canada's Rogers Sportsnet television.

Osmak was born in Ridgewood, New Jersey, but raised in Oakville, Ontario.

After attending Appleby College in Oakville, Ontario, Osmak earned a civil engineering degree from Queen's University in Kingston, Ontario and worked in the industry for several years. She went on to receive a diploma in radio and television broadcasting in 2005 at Seneca College in Toronto and then changed careers, moving to broadcasting. She worked at Jack FM in Orillia, Ontario as a news anchor, then moved to Yuma, Arizona to work at KYMA-TV's morning show for two years, before returning to Canada in 2007 to work for Rogers Sportsnet.

References

1980 births
Living people
Canadian television sportscasters
American civil engineers
People from Ridgewood, New Jersey
American people of Ukrainian descent
Queen's University at Kingston alumni
Seneca College alumni
American emigrants to Canada
Canadian people of Ukrainian descent
Engineers from New Jersey
Canadian women television personalities